Steve, Steven or Stephen Edwards may refer to:

Steve Edwards (American football) (born 1979), American football player for the Arizona Rattlers
Steve Edwards (field hockey) (born 1986), New Zealand Olympic field hockey player
Steve Edwards (physicist) (1930–2016), Professor Emeritus of Physics, Florida State University
Steve Edwards (singer) (born 1980), vocalist on Bob Sinclair's World Hold On and Cassius' The Sound of Violence
Steve Edwards (talk show host) (born 1948), former host of Good Day LA on KTTV (Fired in Dec, 2017)
Steve Edwards, film editor whose credits include Reign Over Me
Steve Edwards, guitarist with the band Elf
Steve Edwards, radio DJ with BBC Radio 1 (1993–1996)
Stephen Edwards (alpine skier) (born 1969), former British alpine skier
Stephen Edwards (composer) (born 1972), American film and TV composer; see Showdown (1993 film)
Stephen Edwards (cricketer) (born 1951), former English cricketer
Steven Edwards (basketball) (born 1973), former American basketball player
Steven Edwards (footballer) (born 1991), Dutch footballer
Steven Edwards (journalist), Canadian journalist, formerly with Canwest News Service
Steven Edwards (The Walking Dead)
Steve Edwards (footballer) (born 1958), English footballer